The 2003 Toray Pan Pacific Open was a women's tennis tournament played on indoor carpet courts. It was the 20th edition of the Toray Pan Pacific Open, and was part of the Tier I Series of the 2003 WTA Tour. It took place at the Tokyo Metropolitan Gymnasium in Tokyo, Japan, from January 28 through February 2, 2003. Lindsay Davenport won the singles title.

Finals

Singles

 Lindsay Davenport defeated  Monica Seles, 6–7(6–8), 6–1, 6–2
 It was Davenport's first singles title of the year and the 38th of her career.

Doubles

 Elena Bovina /  Rennae Stubbs  defeated  Lindsay Davenport /   Lisa Raymond, 6–3, 6–4

External links
Official website
Singles, Doubles and Qualifying Singles draws

Toray Pan Pacific Open
Pan Pacific Open
Toray Pan Pacific Open
Toray Pan Pacific Open
Toray Pan Pacific Open
Toray Pan Pacific Open